The College Heights Herald is the student newspaper of Western Kentucky University in Bowling Green, Kentucky, United States. It is free and distributed throughout the campus and city. The school provides professional staff support and facilities for the newspaper but does not exercise editorial control.  Called the Herald or the WKU Herald for short, the publication is supported through the sale of advertising and is entirely student-run.

Distribution 
During the fall and spring semesters, the Herald print edition is published as a news magazine three times a semester. With a circulation of about 3,000, it serves a campus of about 16,000 with exclusive enterprise not previously published online. The Herald is distributed to more than 100 locations on campus and in Bowling Green. WKUHerald.com, the Herald's digital presence, is updated multiple times daily throughout the year.

Newsletter 
The Herald's primary means of distributing content is its email newsletter, published every weekday during the academic semesters and weekly during the winter and summer breaks. Launched on March 11, 2020, at the start of the coronavirus pandemic, the newsletter now goes to more than 33,000 subscribers. It is published through the Constant Contact platform. The growth of the newsletter prompted student leaders to move their print edition from a weekly newspaper to the current news magazine format focused on exclusive enterprise.

Online 
The Herald's website, WKUHerald.com, features content in a digital format, as well as multimedia such as videos, photo galleries, and audio slideshows. The website serves as a way to release breaking news and allow readers to interact through online comments. WKUHerald is published on the SNO platform. WKUHerald.com uses an flexible format that adapts to the user's device, whether it's a desktop, tablet or mobile phone.

Awards 
Over the years, the Herald has garnered numerous national, regional and state honors. The newspaper has been the recipient of 21 ACP Pacemaker awards, the highest award given to collegiate newspapers, most recently earning two Pacemakers in 2022 (news magazine and online). The Herald also was a finalist for the ACP Multiplatform Pacemaker. The College Heights Herald is a member of the ACP Hall of Fame and is No. 6 on the list of the most successful student media outlets in the century-long history of the ACP Pacemaker Awards.

The Herald also has won multiple Gold Crown Awards and Silver Crown Awards from the Columbia Scholastic Press Association (CSPA).

Other awards include being named the best non-daily student newspaper in the country by the Society of Professional Journalists and 12 General Excellence Awards from the Kentucky Press Association, the most recent in 2014, 2015 and 2016.

References

External links
College Heights Herald website
College Heights Herald multimedia website
Western Kentucky University
WKU Student Newspaper, Staff Members Receive KPA Awards
2001 Mark of Excellence Awards from the Society of Professional Journalists

Student newspapers published in Kentucky
1925 establishments in Kentucky